Totally Minnie is a 1988 musical television special on NBC hosted by Suzanne Somers and starring Minnie Mouse. It was the first film to feature Minnie Mouse in the lead role, and, until the premiere of Mickey Mouse Works in 1999, this was the only time Minnie had any starring role. Russi Taylor, the voice of Minnie at the time, actually met her future husband, Wayne Allwine, then voicing Mickey, while recording this special.

Plot 

The film centers on nerd Maxwell Dweeb (Robert Carradine), who is a loner with no friends. While watching television, he sees an advertisement for the Minnie Mouse Center for the Totally Unhip, named after its owner, Minnie Mouse. Dweeb, in an effort to improve himself socially, decides to attend.

After being welcomed by the Director (Suzanne Somers), Dweeb is taken on a tour of the centre, where other Disney characters run various courses: Goofy is a fitness instructor, Donald Duck is a wardrobe manager, and Pluto is a messenger boy. After finally meeting Minnie Mouse, Dweeb is taken on by the Director. After seeing Elton John sing a duet with Minnie in "Don't Go Breaking My Heart", Maxwell feels he has it figured out and displays his new hip personality with clothes akin to Elton's, but the Director stops him saying that it is just not him, and that hipness does not equal emulation of another's style. Minnie takes Maxwell on a shopping spree; then the Director, impressed by a newly made-over Maxwell Dweeb, decides to date him.

The film is intershot with various musical numbers (including the duet "Don't Go Breaking My Heart" by Minnie Mouse and Elton John) and excerpts from early Disney shorts, including a D-TV number of Janet Jackson's "Nasty" with a montage of male Disney villains such as Black Pete and Captain Hook shown.

Main cast

Voices
Russi Taylor - Minnie Mouse (voice)
Wayne Allwine - Mickey Mouse (voice)
Tony Anselmo - Donald Duck (voice)
Will Ryan - Goofy/Pete (voice)
Don Pardo - Announcer (voice)

Actors
Robert Carradine - Maxwell Dweeb
Suzanne Somers - The Director
Elton John - Himself
Vanna White - Herself
Philip Michael Thomas - Himself

References

External links 
Totally Minnie at the Internet Movie Data Base
Totally Minnie at the Big Cartoon Data Base

1988 television films
1988 films
1980s American television specials
American films with live action and animation
1988 television specials
Disney television specials
1980s English-language films
Mickey Mouse films